Albert Korir (born 2 March 1994) is a Kenyan long-distance runner.

Career 

In 2017, Korir won the Vienna City Marathon with a time of 2:08:40.

In 2019, he won the Houston Marathon with a time of 2:10:02. In this year he also won the marathon event of the Ottawa Race Weekend with a new personal best of 2:08:03. In November 2019, he finished in 2nd place in the New York City Marathon with a time of 2:08:36.

Korir won the 2021 New York City Marathon with a time of 2:08:22.

Achievements

References

External links 

 

Living people
1994 births
Place of birth missing (living people)
Kenyan male marathon runners
Kenyan male long-distance runners
New York City Marathon male winners
21st-century Kenyan people